The following is a list of events relating to television in Ireland from 1987.

Events

10 March – John Wilson is appointed Minister for Communications with responsibility for broadcasting.
31 March – Ray Burke is appointed Minister for Communications with responsibility for broadcasting.
9 May – Ireland wins the Eurovision Song Contest with "Hold Me Now", a song composed and performed by Johnny Logan.
22 June – RTÉ Television introduces its Aertel teletext service.
6 July – NBC's popular television sitcom ALF is officially launched on RTÉ's RTÉ 1.
22 September – Zig and Zag, two extraterrestrials from the planet Zog, make their very first appearance on Dempsey's Den. They would host the programme until 1993, when they would move on to make appearances on British television.
5 November – Irish television and radio presenter Eamonn Andrews, well known for presenting programmes such as World of Sport, What's My Line? and This Is Your Life, dies in London following heart failure; he will be buried in Dublin.
Probable year – Airdate of pirate television station Telefis na Gaeltacht based in Connemara (not to be confused with its similarly named legal successor). Several Irish deflector systems (normally used for relaying British television signals on UHF) occasionally carried local programming.

Debuts

RTÉ 1
3 March –  The Return of the Antelope (1986–1988)
9 April –  Danger Bay (1984–1990)
2 May –  Saturdee (1986)
9 May –  The 13 Ghosts of Scooby-Doo (1985)
8 June –  The Littlest Hobo (1979–1985)
6 July –  ALF (1986–1990)
7 July – / The Berenstain Bears (1985–1987)
9 July –  Yogi's Treasure Hunt (1985–1986)
10 July –  The Wuzzles (1985)
11 July –  Shadow Chasers (1985–1986)
1 August –  Galtar and the Golden Lance (1985–1986)
15 August –  Henry's Leg (1986)
23 September –  The Real Ghostbusters (1986–1991)
30 September –  The Flintstone Kids (1986–1988)
4 October – Where in the World? (1987–2006)
5 October –  Executive Stress (1986–1988)
6 October –  Codename Icarus (1981)
8 October – Know Your Sport (1987–1998)
24 December –  He-Man & She-Ra: A Christmas Special (1985)
Undated –  Alias the Jester (1985–1986)
Undated -  Our House (1986-1988)

RTÉ 2
3 October – Marketplace (1987–1996)
9 November –  The Kids of Degrassi Street (1979–1986)

Changes of network affiliation

Ongoing television programmes

1960s
RTÉ News: Nine O'Clock (1961–present)
RTÉ News: Six One (1962–present)
The Late Late Show (1962–present)

1970s
Sports Stadium (1973–1997)
The Late Late Toy Show (1975–present)
RTÉ News on Two (1978–2014)
Bosco (1979–1996)
The Sunday Game (1979–present)

1980s
Today Tonight (1982–1992)
Mailbag (1982–1996)
Glenroe (1983–2001)
Rapid Roulette (1986–1990)
Live at 3 (1986–1997)
Saturday Live (1986–1999)
Questions and Answers (1986–2009)
Dempsey's Den (1986–2010)

Ending this year
Undated – MT-USA (1984–1987)

Births
9 January – Nicola Coughlan, actress
24 January – Ruth Bradley, actress

Deaths
5 November – Eamonn Andrews, 64, broadcaster and television presenter

See also
1987 in Ireland

References

 
1980s in Irish television